Wigram Brewing Co. is a brewery in Wigram, Christchurch, New Zealand that was established in 2003.

See also 
 List of breweries in New Zealand

References

External links
https://www.wigrambrewing.co.nz/ website
https://app.companiesoffice.govt.nz/companies/app/ui/pages/companies/1207002 New Zealand Companies Office

2003 establishments in New Zealand
Breweries of New Zealand
Companies established in 2003